The United Artists Theatre Building is a vacant high-rise tower in downtown Detroit, Michigan, standing at 150 Bagley Avenue. It was built in 1928 and stands 18 stories tall. The building was designed by architect C. Howard Crane in the renaissance revival architectural style, and is made mainly of brick. Until December 29, 1971, it was a first-run movie house and office space, and then after that, the theatre saw sporadic usage until 1973. The United Artists Theatre, designed in a Spanish-Gothic design, sat 2,070 people, and after closing served from 1978 to 1983 as the Detroit Symphony Orchestra's recording theater. After the theater closed, the office block struggled as tenants moved to suburbs. It finally closed in 1984. An original 10-story, vertical UA sign was replaced in the 1950s with a marquee that remained until 2005. The building once shared a lot with the now demolished Hotel Tuller.

In preparation for the 2006 NFL Super Bowl, graffiti was removed from all the windows of the building, and the lower levels received a coat of black paint to hide the graffiti work at the base of the building. The old theater marquee was also removed.

In 2006, Ilitch Holdings announced it would market the building. Despite a promotional website created in 2017 and assurances of an intent to redevelop the historically significant structure, Ilitch Holdings has yet to begin any redevelopment. The company has a history of buying historic properties, voicing an intent to redevelop them, and later turning them into parking lots following increased decay.

Demolition of the historic theatre began in 2022.

References

Further reading

External links
 United Artists Theatre at Buildings of Detroit 
  recent image of the interior of the theatre.

Theatres in Detroit
Cinemas and movie theaters in Michigan
Downtown Detroit
Theatre Building, Detroit
Skyscraper office buildings in Detroit
Unused buildings in Detroit
Office buildings completed in 1928
Theatres completed in 1928
1928 establishments in Michigan